Because I Said So is a 2002 Canadian talk show television series hosted by former lawyer, stand-up comedian, and actress Maggie Cassella.

Plot summary

 Maggie Cassella hosts celebrities who talk about the worst aspects of the entertainment industry.

External links

 

2000s Canadian television talk shows
OutTV (Canadian TV channel) original programming
2000s Canadian LGBT-related television series